Sergei Yudin may refer to:

 Sergei Yudin (tenor) (1889–1963), Russian opera singer, a lyric tenor
 Sergei Yudin (surgeon) (1891–1954), Russian physician who developed early blood bank practices
 Sergei Yudin (chess player) (born 1986), Russian chess grandmaster